Tricked is a British television show presented by magician Ben Hanlin and first broadcast on ITV2 on 10 October 2013. The show features him pranking various celebrity guests with illusions.

In March 2014, it was confirmed that a second series of Tricked had been commissioned which began on 23 September 2014. In 2014, ITV confirmed that a third series of Tricked had been commissioned. The series began on 6 October 2015.

On 20 February 2019, Hanlin confirmed on an Instagram live story that the series will not return.

A Canadian adaptation hosted by Eric Leclerc, also titled Tricked, was created by Force Four Entertainment for YTV in 2016.

Episodes

Series 1 (2013)

AThis episode was a Halloween edition of the show

Series 2 (2014)

Series 3 (2015)

Halloween Special (2016)

References

2010s British comedy television series
2013 British television series debuts
2016 British television series endings
British television magic series
English-language television shows
Hidden camera television series
ITV comedy
Television series by ITV Studios